Bhool Bhulaiyaa is an Indian Hindi-language, Horror-comedy film series. The first film Bhool Bhulaiyaa is directed by Priyadarshan and produced by Bhushan Kumar and Krishan Kumar while second film Bhool Bhulaiyaa 2 was directed by Anees Bazmee and produced by Bhushan Kumar, Murad Khetani, Anjum Khetani and Krishan Kumar. The first film of this series was the remake of the Malayalam film Manichitrathazhu. The series stars Akshay Kumar, Tabu, Kartik Aaryan and Rajpal Yadav. The third installment of the series Bhool Bhulaiyaa 3 was announced with a teaser and scheduled to be released on Diwali 2024.

It is currently the 16th highest-grossing Indian film series of all time in general.

Films and overview

Bhool Bhulaiyaa (2007)

Badri (Manoj Joshi) heads a Brahmin family whose ancestral palace in Rajasthan is believed to be haunted by the ghost of Manjulika, a Bengali classical dancer. Siddharth (Shiney Ahuja) and Avni (Vidya Balan), the son and daughter-in-law of Badri's elder brother, return to their native village from the United States and decide to stay in their ancestral palace. This leads to Siddharth's childhood love interest Radha (Ameesha Patel), who is Badri's adopted daughter, becoming jealous but she immediately recovers. Siddharth is crowned as the king, his right to the throne.

The palace where Siddharth and Avni were staying was once occupied by Raja Vibhuti Narayan, who was Siddharth's ancestor. He had fallen in love with Manjulika, a dancer hailing from Bengal. But Manjulika was in love with Shashidhar, another dancer, who resided in a house just behind the palace and often met her secretly. On the night of Durga Ashtami, when the king gets to know of the affair and their plan to elope, he calls them to perform a dance one last time in the court. In the end, the king beheads Shashidhar and imprisons Manjulika in her room. Then on the day of the king's marriage, Manjulika hangs herself and swore that her spirit would not leave any king who lived in that very palace. Various omens started taking place after that, presuming that the "evil eye" may have befallen on the king. The king too dies under unknown circumstances. Soon, with the aid of powerful sorcerers, both Shashidhar's and Manjulika's spirits were locked up in a room in the third floor of the palace using a sacred talisman.

Events take a twist when Avni obtains a copy of the third floor room key and opens the forbidden locked room that contains the ghost of Manjulika. Unnatural events start taking place inside the palace. Avni falls in love with the place and learns about Manjulika and her tragic story. She becomes enamored with Manjulika. Badri and Batuk Shankar (Paresh Rawal) try to ward off the evil eye with the help of a priest, Shri Yagyaprakashji Bharti (Vikram Gokhale), but unfortunately the priest has gone to London and is unsure when he might return.

Siddharth starts suspecting Radha for all the strange occurrences. He thinks she has gone crazy since he was supposed to marry her, but married Avni instead. He calls his friend, psychiatrist Dr. Aditya Shrivastav (Akshay Kumar) from New York, to try to figure out what the problem is with Radha. Once Aditya reaches the palace, things become comical, as everyone thinks he is a fool, though he is very intelligent. Aditya eventually realizes that Radha is not at fault, and that someone else behind it all, and falls in love with her. One night, he encounters Manjulika and dares her to strike. The ghost angrily vows to take her revenge on the auspicious day of Durgashtami.

During the engagement of Siddharth's cousin Nandini, and Sharad Prahlad (Vineeth), Avni spills tea on Sharad and takes him away to get him cleaned. When Aditya and Siddharth search for her, they see that there is a struggle between Avni and Sharad, and quickly intervene. Siddharth thinks that Sharad was violating Avni, but Aditya tells him that Avni is the real culprit, not Radha as previously suspected. It is revealed that Avni has dissociative identity disorder, a disease that affects the person's identity, making them think they're someone else. Aditya explains that Avni is the one making all the strange things happen around the palace. He reveals that he visited Avni's hometown to gather information about her childhood and has factual evidence. He then tells the half-convinced Siddtharth to provoke Avni in order to make him realize that something is wrong. When Siddharth provokes her, Avni shows the dark personality of Manjulika before returning to her usual self, much to the horror and concern of Siddharth, who asks Aditya to save Avni.

During Durgashtami, Aditya and Siddharth see Avni consumed in Manjulika's identity, dressed as her and dancing to the tunes Manjulika had been dancing to with her love, Shashidhar, before the king murdered him. The tragic love story of the old Raja Vibhuti Narayan, who loved Manjulika, who in turn loved Shashidhar, is revealed. Avni imagines herself as Manjulika and Sharad as Shashidhar, dancing in the court of the king. Avni completely assumes the identity of Manjulika and tries to kill her own husband Siddharth; she sees him as the king who had killed Manjulika's lover.

To cure Avni, Aditya triggers Manjulika's personality and makes her promise to leave Avni if she gets the opportunity to kill the king and take her revenge. The priest Shri Yagyaprakashji Bharti arrives and with his help, during the ritual of Durgashtami, Aditya lays out an intricate plan to trick Manjulika into thinking she is killing the king when she is actually slaying a dummy. After the "murder", Manjulika, now content, leaves Avni forever. Avni is healed and everything ends well. Aditya tells Radha, whom he has taken a liking to, that he will send his parents over if she is interested in marrying him, to which a happy Radha gives her silent consent.

Bhool Bhulaiyaa 2 (2022)

Across a mansion in Bhawanigarh, Rajasthan in 2004, the priests confine a malevolent spirit named Manjulika, who is hell-bent on attacking the family's daughter-in-law Anjulika to a room. After this, the family deserts the mansion for safety.

18 years later, in Himachal Pradesh, Ruhaan Randhawa meets Reet Thakur who is on a trip to Bhawanigarh via Chandigarh to marry her fiancée Sagar reluctantly. They board a bus to Chandigarh but cut short their journey for attending a music carnival and later discover that the bus they were supposed to travel met with an accident, killing everyone on board. Subsequently, the Thakurs, who are owners of the mansion that was deserted 18 years ago, assumed her to be dead. Reet tries contacting her family but over the phone she overhears a conversation between Trisha and Sagar, realizing an affair brewing between them. Seeking to earn them the gift of marriage so she could avoid falling into it, Reet plays along her family's presumption about her demise and travels to Bhawanigarh with a hesitating Ruhaan.

They decide to hide in the deserted ancestral mansion, but Chote Pandit, a priest, spots the doors of the mansion opened and informs the Thakurs, who along with the villagers enter the mansion and spot Ruhaan, who covers up the situation by lying that Reet's spirit led him there and her final wish is to see her family living in the ancestral mansion and that too with Trisha being married. Under Ruhaan's influence, The Thakurs fix Trisha's wedding with Sagar. Due to his presumed ability of communicating with spirits, Ruhaan becomes popular as Rooh Baba, where he and Reet become friends. When Ruhaan is led to the room where the spirit was trapped, Anjulika, Reet's sister-in-law, warns him to stay away from the room and reveals that the spirit is actually Anjulika's twin sister Manjulika.

The sisters had migrated to the mansion when their father Debanshu was asked to manage accounts for the Thakurs. Debanshu's biased affection towards Anjulika's talents instilled jealousy in Manjulika which turned into hatred. In 2004, both the sisters fell in love with Uday Thakur, Reet's elder brother. However, Uday reciprocated Anjulika's feelings leaving Manjulika fuming and deceived. Manjulika, who sought solace in learning black magic, decided to use the magic as a weapon against Anjulika. On the night of Uday and Anjulika's wedding, Manjulika brutally stabbed Debanshu for finding out the truth and set out to murder Anjulika, but she saved herself and stabbed Manjulika in self-defense killing her. Despite being dead, Manjulika did not leave the family alone as her spirit continued to harm them and paralyzed Uday by pushing him off the balcony. The priests captured Manjulika and lock her in the third floor.

After the flashback, Reet's father reveals to Ruhaan that Manjulika's curse had killed eight members of their family. One night, Chote Pandit finds Ruhaan and Reet roaming around the mansion and discovers the truth. With the help of his elder brother Bade Pandit and his wife whose business is being affected due to Ruhaan's popularity, Chote Pandit spearheads a search in the mansion. Knowing that no one would enter Manjulika's room, Reet resolves to hide there and Chote Pandit's accusations are proved false to the family. Freed, Manjulika attacks Anjulika, who discovers the truth about Reet being alive and joins hands with Ruhaan and Reet to ward off the spirit. They take help from the same priest who captured Manjulika's spirit but he tells them that he requires three days. Manjulika's spirit possesses the priest and makes him kill his disciples before being killed by himself. Ruhaan encounters the spirit and falls off the terrace out of fear.

Ruhaan returns to the palace, conversing in Bengali, and claims himself to be Manjulika revealing that he is possessed. The Thakurs spot Reet and learn that she is alive. Ruhaan attacks Anjulika, who uses Reet as a human shield by threatening to slit her throat if Ruhaan attacks her and addresses him as "Anjulika", which confuses the family. Ruhaan reveals that he has been putting up an act of being possessed by the spirit and that the woman who died in 2004 was actually Anjulika while one who is living with them is the real Manjulika.

In 2004, after killing Debanshu with the help of the priest, revealed to be Manjulika's accomplice, Manjulika influenced Anjulika using black magic and stole her identity. Disguised as Manjulika under the influence of black magic, Anjulika attacked Manjulika who stabbed her to death under the pretext of self-defense. When Uday discovered the truth, Manjulika pushed him off the balcony, paralyzing him and thus preventing him from telling anyone. She also killed eight members of the family for learning the truth. Presently, Anjulika's spirit attacks Manjulika and imprisons her in the same room in which she got locked in 2004. Anjulika's spirit has a moment with her family and asks Reet's father to forgive her since it revealed the truth of Anjulika and Manjulika. She thanks Ruhaan and asks the family to leave as she has unfinished business with Manjulika. Anjulika enters the room and kills the real Manjulika. The whole Thakur family leaves the palace, which becomes abandoned again.

Bhool Bhulaiyaa 3 (2024)
Third installment of Bhool Bhulaiyaa series.

Cast

Bhool Bhulaiyaa
 Akshay Kumar as Dr. Aditya "Adi" Shrivastav
 Vidya Balan in dual roles as Avni S. Chaturvedi and Manjulika
 Shiney Ahuja in dual roles as Siddharth Chaturvedi and Raja Vibhuti Narayan
 Ameesha Patel as Radha  Chaturvedi
 Paresh Rawal as Batukshankar Upadhyay
 Manoj Joshi as Badrinarayan "Badri" Chaturvedi
 Rajpal Yadav as Chhote Pandit
 Asrani as Murari
 Vikram Gokhale as Acharya Yagyaprakash Bharti
 Rasika Joshi as Janki Batukshankar Upadhyay (née Chaturvedi)
 Tarina Patel as Nandini Sharad Pradhan (née Upadhyay)
 Vineeth in dual roles as Professor Sharad Pradhan and Shashidhar
 Kaveri Jha as Girja Upadhyay
 Jimit Trivedi as Chandu Chaturvedi
 Baby Farida as Avni's Grandmother
 Ashmita as Manjulika's double

Bhool Bhulaiyaa 2
 Tabu in dual roles as Anjulika Chatterjee and Manjulika Chatterjee
 Kartik Aaryan as Ruhaan Randhawa a.k.a. Rooh Baba
 Kiara Advani as Reet Thakur
 Rajpal Yadav as Chhote Pandit
 Amar Upadhyay as Uday Thakur
 Sanjay Mishra as Bade Pandit
 Mehak Manwani as Trisha Thakur
 Ashwini Kalsekar as Panditayeen: Bade Pandit's wife
 Milind Gunaji as Thakur Vijender Singh: Reet's father
 Karmveer Choudhary as Mukhiyaji: the village's chieftain
 Rajesh Sharma as Kulwant Thakur: Reet's uncle
 Samarth Chauhan as Punit "Potlu" Thakur: Reet's cousin
 Govind Namdev as Tantrik Baba: the spirit hunter
 Vyoma Nandi as Rajeshwari "Rajjo" Thakur: Reet's cousin
 Kali Prasad Mukherjee as Debanshu Chatterjee; Anjulika and Manjulika's father

Bhool Bhulaiyaa 3
 Kartik Aaryan as Rooh Baba

Cast and characters

Crew

Box office

Music
The songs are composed by Pritam in the first installment and the second installment, while Tanishk Bagchi appeared as the guest composer in the second film. Ranjit Barot composed the film score for Bhool Bhulaiyaa and Sandeep Shirodkar composed for Bhool Bhulaiyaa 2. All lyrics in the first film are written by Sameer Anjaan and Sayeed Quadri. The lyrics of BB2 are written by Amitabh Bhattacharya, Sameer Anjaan, Yo Yo Honey Singh, Mandy Gill and Saaveri Verma.

Awards and nominations

Bhool Bhulaiyaa

IIFA Awards

Nominated
 Best Director – Priyadarshan
 Best Actor – Akshay Kumar
 Best Actress – Vidya Balan
 Best Villain – Vidya Balan
 Best Comedian – Paresh Rawal & Rajpal Yadav
 Best Music Director – Pritam
 Best Male Playback Singer – Neeraj Shridhar (for "Bhool Bhulaiyaa")
 Best Female Playback Singer – Shreya Ghoshal (for "Mere Dholna")

2008 Zee Cine Awards

Nominated
 Best Actress – Vidya Balan

Filmfare Awards

Nominated
 Best Actress – Vidya Balan

Anandalok Awards
Won
 Best Actress (Hindi) – Vidya Balan

Bhool Bhulaiyaa 2
IIFA Awards

Nominated
 Best Actor – Kartik Aaryan
 Best Actress – Tabu
 Best Director – Anees Bazmee
 Best Music Director – Pritam

2023 Zee Cine Awards
Won
 Best Actor – Kartik Aaryan
Nominated
 Best Actress – Kiara Advani
 Best Film – Bhool Bhulaiyaa 2

References

Indian film series
Comedy film series
Horror film series